Palaquium vexillatum is a tree in the family Sapotaceae. The specific epithet  is from the Latin meaning "flag-like", referring to the stipules.

Description
Its bark is light brown. The inflorescences bear up to five flowers.

Distribution and habitat
Palaquium vexillatum is endemic to Borneo. Its habitat is in secondary forests.

References

vexillatum
Endemic flora of Borneo
Trees of Borneo
Plants described in 1960